"Nothing Is Promised" is a song recorded by American producer Mike Will Made It and Barbadian recording artist Rihanna. It was released on June 3, 2016 to digital outlets as the lead single from Mike Will's album, Ransom 2. Billboard described the track as "trap leaning".

Background
In November 2014, Rihanna released a snippet of a song via her official Instagram account, the song featured lyrics such as "Ain't none of this shit promised, ain't none of this promised" and "Ain't none of this shit certain, ain't none of it certain", whilst the rest of the snippet featured "plinky synths and booming bass providing the only instrumentation." Following the release many assumed that it was a song for Rihanna's then-upcoming eighth studio album Anti (2016). In July 2015, Mike Will Made It posted a 15-second video clip featuring a snippet of Rihanna singing; in June of the following year he released their collaboration as the lead single from his album.

Track listing

Charts

Certifications

References

External links
 

2016 singles
2015 songs
Rihanna songs
Song recordings produced by Mike Will Made It
Songs written by Rihanna
Songs written by Mike Will Made It
Songs written by Future (rapper)
Songs written by Asheton Hogan